The Philippine tree squirrel (Sundasciurus philippinensis) is a species of rodent in the family Sciuridae which is endemic to the Philippines.

References

Further reading
Thorington, R. W. Jr. and R. S. Hoffman. 2005. Family Sciuridae. pp. 754–818 in Mammal Species of the World a Taxonomic and Geographic Reference. D. E. Wilson and D. M. Reeder eds. Johns Hopkins University Press, Baltimore.

Sundasciurus
Rodents of the Philippines
Endemic fauna of the Philippines
Mammals described in 1839
Taxonomy articles created by Polbot